Alat (a.k.a. Ala-at, Ala, Alachin, Alagchin, Alchin, Alchi, Alayontli, Ulayundluğ (اُوﻻيُنْدْلُغْ) ("piebald horse", pinto); Boma 駁馬 or 駮馬 "piebald horse", Helai 賀賴, Helan 賀蘭, Hela 曷剌, Bila 弊剌; dru-gu ha-la-yun-log "Ha la yun log Turks") were one salient Turkic tribe known from Chinese annals.

Alats were possibly identical to Luandi or Xueyantuo; or Khalajes, a Central Asian people known to medieval Arab and Persian Muslim geographers and in Bactrian inscriptions,

Literature on Alats is very rich; Alats were a subject of study by Tangshu,  Jiu Tangshu, Tang Huiyao, N.Ya. Bichurin, S.E. Malov, N.A. Aristov, Grigory Grum-Grshimailo, Yu. Nemeth, G. Hоworth, P. Pelliot, L. Hambis, and others.

Name
In ancient Turkic lexicon, the meaning of "skewbald" (horse) is expressed with the terms "ala" or "alagchin" still active now in composite expressions. Zuev took this as a variant of 遏羅支 Eluozhi (supposedly from MC *a-la-tsie) and asserted that this is the earliest transmission and certainly ascends to Alagchin (Alachin, Alchin, Alchi). During the Tang period, Chinese chroniclers calqued the ethonym Alat as Boma "skewbald horses". Elsewhere, Zuev stated that "Sometimes the tribal name 曷剌 Hela (< ɣа-lât < *alat < *ala-at "skewbald horse") is written down with hieroglyphs 賀賴 Helai (ɣâ-lâi < alai), which is equivalent to 賀蘭 Helan (< alan ~ ala "skewbald, motley, mixed"). Since Oghuz (Turkmen) tribe of Alayontli has the same tamga as  Boma (Alat) tribe and whose name also translates as "skewbald horse", Zuev is certain that Alayontli is the same tribe as alat.

Chinese transcribers also preserved many similar titles, individual and tribal names in Xianbei society, where horses were held in high esteem: 
 tribal name Helan (賀蘭); 
 individual names: such as Xiongnu Shanyu Helaitou (賀賴頭); Tuyuhun prince Helutou (賀虜頭); Tiefu Xiongnu chief Liuhu's second son Eloutou (閼陋頭); Northern Wei general Gao Huan's Xianbei name Heliuhun (賀六渾), Aliutou (阿六頭), Heliutou (賀六頭); 
 the title Helazhen 賀剌真 (recorded in Nanqishu) of bodyguards (三郎 sānlāng) serving Northern Wei emperors in the 5th century.

According to Peter A. Boodberg the title Helazhen transcribes "undoubtedly *atlačin 'horseman' from Tk. atla 'to mount a horse'", thus "a purely Turkish form in T'o-pa". All of those foresaid names & titles are traceable back to Turkic or Turco-Mongol *atlan "to ride" < *at- "horse", whereas *ala- *alaɣ-, or *alutu means "variegated", "dappled", or "piebald", thus describing the preferred coat-color(s) of nomadic northerners' warhorses.

The ethnonym Alat might have been transcribed as Khalaj or Qalaj in Persian, Arabic and Bactrian sources, corresponding to 訶(達)羅支 He(da)luozhi (< *ha-(dat-)la-tɕĭe)  or 葛(達)羅支 Ge(da)luozhi (< *kat-(dat-)la-tɕĭe), which in turn are variants of 葛羅支 Geluozhi. According to New Book of Tang (vol. 217), Boma  駁馬  ~ Bila 弊剌 ~Eluozhi 遏羅支 neighboured the Jiegu 結骨 (i.e. Yenisei Kyrgyz). Arab geographer al-Idrisi recorded that the Khalajes' winter quarter and castle were situated near the Kimeks, who in turn dwelt in the Irtysh basin, to the north and/or west of the Kirghizes. Thus, based on geographic arrangements, the Boma ~ Bila ~ Eluozhi (i.e. Alats) might be the same as Khalajes.

Tongdian glossed Helan as simply "horse" in Old Turkic and Yuanhe Maps and Records of Prefectures and Counties glossed Helan as "piebald horse",

Physical Appearance
The New Book of Tang described the facial appearance of Alats, called Boma ~ Bila ~ Elouzhi, as resembling Kyrghyzes'. 9th-century author Duan Chengshi described the Kyrgyz tribe (Jiankun buluo 堅昆部落) as "yellow-haired, green-eyed, red-mustached [and red-]bearded". New Book of Tang also described the Kyrghyzes (whose name was transcribed as  堅昆 Jiankun in ancient days, 黠戛斯 Xiajiasi, 居勿 Juwu, 結骨 Hegu) "all tall, red-haired, pale-faced, green-irised"; Kyrgyzes regarded as black hair as "infelicitous" (bù xiáng 不祥) and insisted that black-eyed individuals were descendants of Han general Li Ling (李陵).

History

Southern Xiongnu in China
Fang Xuanling, in Jinshu, (Ch. 110) states that around 349-370 CE the Xiongnu leader, titled Chanyu, Hèlàitóu (賀賴頭) (lit. "Alat head", "leader of the Alat tribe") brought his tribe of 35 thousand to the Xianbei Former Yan state and submitted to its emperor Murong Jun. Helaitou was bestowed a title of General Pacifying the West, and settled in the Daizong district. The Helai was listed as the 14th of 19 tribes of the Southern Xiongnu Shanyu.

According to the Chinese annals, the home of the Southern Xiongnu tribe Alat was either Alashan Mountains or the basin of the Narym River.

Alat as a component tribe
Alats integrated themselves into the Xianbei confederation. The Tuoba-Xianbei-founded Northern Wei dynasty's Eight Great Noble Clans (八大貴族) were Buliugu 步六孤, Helai 賀賴, Dugu 獨孤, Helou 賀樓, Huniu 忽忸, Qiumu 丘穆, Gexi 紇奚, and Yuchi 尉遲.  From the 3rd century, Helan tribe also offered marriage alliances with the imperial Tuoba 拓拔 clan.

Al-Khwarizmi asserted that Khalajes were one of the two remnant tribes of the Hephthalites. Even so, modern Khalaj have no idea about their origins, and Sims-Williams cited Bactrian documents which dated from the years 678 and 710 and named a Khalaj people, thus these new archaeological documents do not support the suggestion that Khalajes were the Hephthalites' successors. According to Minorsky, Khalajes were "perhaps only politically associated with the Hephthalites."

Middle Ages
Jiu Tangshu & Tongdian mentioned a tribe of "skewbald horses" Boma, besides Basmyls, Kyrghyzes, Khwarazmians etc., who in 638, submitted to the Western Turkic Duolu Qaghan. Tongdian cites as a comment a fragment from an unknown composition that "Tujue call the skewbald horses Hélà (曷剌) (MC: *ɦɑt̚-lɑt̚), and the state is also called Hela (曷剌國)".

Jin Tangshu also noted that Alats and Kyrgyzes spoke mutually unintelligible languages.

From the story of Abulgazi and description of two Mongolian embassies (in 1233 and 1254) to Alachins, they lived along Yenisei, the sources of Angara, and the east coast of lake Baikal, called by the Chinese chroniclers "Northern sea". Based on annalistic traditions, the author of the "Family tree of Türks" Abulgazi described the country of skewbald horses:
 "A multitude of Tatar tribes coached along the banks of the Angara-muren, which runs east of the Kirgiz country and runs into the sea. On the seacoast at the estuary of this river is a large city surrounded by settlements where live nomadic tribes in large numbers. Their horses are large... All of them are skewbald in hue, there are no others. Near that city called Alakchin was a silver spring, therefore all caldrons, dishes, and vases were from silver. It is that country that the Uzbeks mean when say: "there is a country where all horses are skewbald, and the stoves are from gold".
The Khaljī tribe had long been settled in Afghanistan. A Khalji dynasty of Turkic Khalaj origin ruled large parts of South Asia from 1290 to 1320, they were the second Muslim dynasty to rule the Delhi Sultanate of India, they are noted in history for repeatedly defeating the warring Mongols and thereby saving India from plundering raids and attacks.

Modern time
After the Russian revolution in 1917, Alats (Kazakh: Alaş), named after a legendary founder of the Kazakh people, headed a movement of the Turkestan peoples for independence, and created a functioning state of the Kazakh people known as Alash Autonomy that operated between December 13, 1917, and August 26, 1920, controlling roughly the territory of the present-day Republic of Kazakhstan, with a capital in Alash-qala (modern Semey). The Alash leaders in December 1917 proclaimed establishment of Alash Orda, a Kazakh government, aligned with the Russian White Army and fought against the Bolsheviks.

In 1919, when the White forces were losing, Alash Autonomous government began negotiations with the Bolsheviks. In 1919–20 Bolsheviks defeated the White Russian forces in the region and occupied Kazakhstan. On August 26, 1920, the new Soviet government disbanded the Alash Autonomy, and established the "Kyrgyz Autonomous Soviet Socialist Republic", later the name was changed in 1925 to "Kazak Autonomous Soviet Socialist Republic" and changed again in 1936 to "Kazakh Soviet Socialist Republic". However, the movement for independence continued, and it continued until 1925, when the war for independence was finally extinguished

Modern demographics
The historical Alats' descendants now live in China, Russia in the Altai, Kazakhstan, Uzbekistan, Turkey, the Caucasus, eastern section of the Iranian plateau; as well as possibly Turkmenistan, India, and Afghanistan, if Alats were indeed the Khalajes known in Bactrian inscriptions and to medieval Arab and Persians geographers.

Alat tribe members who migrated to China changed their surname to Hè (trad. 賀; simp. 贺) and would eventually become assimilated into Han Chinese.

Alats are also the main ethnic component in the Kazakh Junior-Kishi Zhuz and constitute parts of Uzbeks. Further west, Alats constitute one Oghuz Turkish tribe, Ulayundluğ in Turkish and Alayuntluq in Azeri, which means "with spotted horses". Ulanyundluğ's descendants live in Central Turkey. Ulayundluğ participated in the ethnogenesis of Azeris, as Ulayundluğ tamgas have been found in historical residences of Azeris in Georgia, Armenia, and the modern Republic of Azerbaijan.

Notes

References

Turkic peoples of Asia
Oghuz tribes